On 29 September 1981, an Iranian Air Force C-130 military cargo aircraft crashed into a firing range near Kahrizak, Iran. The plane was flying from Ahvaz, Khuzestan Province to Tehran, while returning from an inspection tour of Iranian military gains in the Iran–Iraq War.

The crashed killed 80 people, including former Defence Minister Javad Fakoori, then-Defence Minister Mousa Namjoo, then-Chief-of-Staff of the Army Valiollah Fallahi, and then-commander of the Islamic Revolutionary Guard Corps Mohammad Jahanara.

Background

In order to break the Siege of Abadan, the Operation Samen-ol-A'emeh was performed from 27 to 29 September 1981. To transfer the report of the Operation Samen-ol-A'emeh to Tehran, it was decided that several Iranian military leaders were to return to Tehran by a Lockheed C-130 Hercules aircraft.

Crash 
At 19:00 local time (15:30 UTC) on 29 September 1981, the C-130 cargo aircraft crashed into a firing range near Kahrizak, Iran. The plane was flying from Ahvaz in southwestern Khuzestan Province to Tehran, while returning from an inspection tour of Iranian military gains in the Iran–Iraq War.

Casualties 

The crashed killed all 80 people on board, including former Defence Minister Javad Fakoori, then-Defence Minister Mousa Namjoo, Iranian General Valiollah Fallahi, and then-commander of the Islamic Revolutionary Guard Corps Mohammad Jahanara. The four had played vital roles in the Iran–Iraq War, and the plane was carrying casualties of the war.

Initially, there was no official explanation for what caused the crash. The crash caused Iran to lose several military leaders, who were trying to break the Siege of Abadan. An undetermined number of Iranians who were wounded from the war were also in the plane.

Causes
There was no official explanation given for reasons of the crash, and just one source called it the result of a "technical fault". On the other hand, in a speech following the incident Ayatollah Ruhollah Khomeini made a reference to Mujahedeen Khalq as the perpetrator without clearly condemning the leftist group.

See also
Aviation accidents and incidents
Iran–Iraq relations
Transport in Iran

References

External links
 Description of the crash from the pilot (Persian) 
 Description of the crash (Persian)

Aviation accidents and incidents in Iran
Islamic Republic of Iran Air Force
Accidents and incidents involving the Lockheed C-130 Hercules
History of Tehran
Accidental deaths in Iran
1981 in Iran